is a Japanese light novel series written by Akamitsu Awamura and illustrated by Refeia. SB Creative has published twenty-two volumes since November 2012 under their GA Bunko imprint. A 12-episode anime television series adaptation by Diomedéa aired between January 11 and March 29, 2015. A manga adaptation began serialization in Kadokawa Shoten's seinen manga magazine Comp Ace from June 2014. A game adaptation by the Japanese company ASOBIMO has also been released.

Plot
World Break: Aria of Curse for a Holy Swordsman takes place at a school named Akane Academy, where students with special powers and known as Saviors are trained to defend against monsters called Metaphysicals, which brutally and indiscriminately attack humans. Saviors, divided into Shirogane (White Iron) and Kuroma (Black Magic), are the reincarnations of talented individuals who possess awakened memories of their past lives. Shirogane manifest weapons and martial techniques while Kuroma manifest magic for defense purposes.

The story follows main protagonist, Moroha Haimura, who is unique in that he has awakened memories of two past lives: Flaga, a swordmaster and prince of a small country, and Shu Saura, a magician and King of the Netherworld. This gives Moroha the abilities of both a Shirogane and Kuroma. At the Academy he meets Satsuki, a boisterous girl who is very boastful and brash and who was Sarasha, Flaga's sister, in her past life; and Shizuno, a calm and levelheaded girl, who was Shu Saura's wife. With his unique abilities he joins the Striker Unit, Akane Academy's team of elite Saviors.

Moroha's plans for a peaceful school life go up in flames when Satsuki and Shizuno begin to vie for his attention and matters only get worse when Metaphysicals start appearing.

Characters

Main characters

The protagonist. He is very dependable, although he is easily embarrassed when teased. He has two past lives: the first being a Shirogane named Flaga, who was in love with his sister, Sarasha, who happens to be Satsuki's previous incarnation, and the second being a Kuroma named Shu Saura, who was in a relationship with Shizuno's previous incarnation. Due to having memories of both past lives, he is known as an Ancient Dragon and is both a Shirogane and a Kuroma. His sword is "Saratiga" which is a straight katana, while as a Kuroma his dark art is "Black Gehenna" that he infuses into his sword to maximize its destructive capability, calling it "Yin Yang Kurikara". His other abilities includes the dark art "Ouroboros" which is a water spell that allows him to flood vast areas with water (it also allows him to walk on water) and "Gorikitsu" which allows him to maximize his prana. It is later revealed that Moroha is cursed by an extremely powerful Metaphysical, the "Ancient Dragon," that has hounded him in all of his past lives. It hunted and killed the previous incarnations of both Satsuki and Shizuno.

She is a boisterous girl who is very boastful and brash. She is classmates with Moroha and Shizuno. In her past life she was a princess named Sarasha who was in love with her older brother, Flaga, one of Moroha's past lives. In the present, because they are no longer related by blood, Satsuki plans to renew their previous relationship. She and her family often had to move from place to place in order to avoid attacks from Metaphysicals, which made it hard for her to make friends. This is made more difficult due to her condescending attitude towards everyone except Moroha. Despite her attitude, she doesn't hesitate to help others, even when she is in a disadvantage. She is good at cooking and always prepares Moroha's meals. As a Savior, she is a Shirogane who uses light skills that materialize into a short sword called "Acieal". She is also capable of detecting incoming Metaphysicals. As she develops her skills she is able to move much more quickly and is able to manifest Kongoutsu, an armor-like force field. In her past life as Sarasha she was burned to death by the ancient dragon while fleeing from it.

Shizuno is calm and levelheaded girl who is classmates with Moroha and Satsuki. She is a Kuroma whose previous incarnation was the Witch of the Netherworld, and she uses dark arts by chanting spells and channeling them through her staff. Her dark arts seem to focus on freezing and ice spells, including "Dreadful Blizzard". In her past life, she was in a relationship with Shu Saura, Moroha's other past life. She is brazen with her feelings towards Moroha to the point that she doesn't mind kissing him in public, especially in front of Satsuki. Her elder brother is the president of the school, and who nominated her for inclusion in the Strikers, where she serves as a reserve. Shizuno was born into an affluent family of utmost influence; however belonging to such a family is burdensome for her; their high expectations make her feel shackled and her only means of escape is by sleeping and dreaming about her past life with Shu Saura. She and Satsuki are rivals for Moroha's affections although they can put aside their differences when the situation demands. In her past life as the "Witch of the Netherworld," the ancient dragon turned her to ice by using her own ice spell against her.

Mari's much younger sister, Maya is a prodigy whose powers as a Savior awakened at a very early age. Although she is too young to attend the Academy as a student, she serves as her sister's assistant. Her powers allow her to heal injuries and she can also cast "Field of Dreams", a field covering a wide area that allows dueling Saviors to fight without getting seriously injured and can also act as a protective barrier against any incoming attacks. Because of this, Maya's primary responsibility is safety around campus. Despite her young age, she knows how to drive her sister's car.
When Moroha arrives at the Academy, her sister assigns her to watch over him. She moves in with Moroha and even sleeps in his bed, referring to herself as his body pillow and harem personnel of the future, much to the chagrin of Moroha, Satsuki, and Shizuno.

A second year student and a member of the Swords of Salvation, nicknamed "Momo." Although she is a Shirogane, she is known more for her speed than her fighting ability. It is also implied that she has feelings for Moroha shown by their good relationship and how she behaves around him.

Elena is a transfer student from Russia and often goes by the nickname "Lesya". She is a trained assassin who is known as the "Maneater", a reference to her demon sword "Replazan" that can consume both prana (light skills) and mana. She comes to Japan to assassinate Moroha believing (falsely) that her younger brother will be killed if she fails. It is revealed that she was an only child who was orphaned at an early age and that her memories have been manipulated by Vasilisa's subordinate, Cordat. After being freed of her demon sword by Moroha, she falls in love with him and starts to call him onii-chan, much to Satsuki's dismay.

Striker Unit

A third-year student who is the Captain of the school's elite anti-Metaphysical fighters called the Swords of Salvation. He is a Shirogane whose weapon is "Naivete," a long and heavy broadsword. He recruits Moroha after he defeats his younger brother. He also recruits Shizuno as a reserves upon her elder brother's recommendation. He later recruits Satsuki after she confronts a dreadnought-type Metaphysical despite being at a disadvantage. Jin admires Moroha's courage and, even though he is a senior, is willing to learn from him.

Tokiko is a third-year student and vice captain of the Swords of Salvation. She is a Kuroma who specializes in fire spells like "Incinerator." She is a brash pervert who makes sexual advances at anyone who catches her interest, regardless of gender. She seems particularly taken with Moroha and has pinched his rear end, straddled him, and even hugged him with his head in her cleavage. She tends to get so carried away with her sexual fantasies about Moroha that Jin has to step in to restrain her.

Sophie is a third-year student hailing from the United States and a Shirogane member of the Swords of Salvation. She tends to intersperse her speech with English words and phrases. Her weapon resembles a two-headed Kanabo.

Six Heads

The United Kingdom's executive of the Six Heads. He takes a liking towards Moroha after he is nearly defeated by him, nicknaming him "Jack", since Moroha is full of surprises like a Jack-in-the-Box. He seems to dislike Natto.

Russia's executive of the Six Heads. She is known as the Lightning Empress/Russian Terror or Terror Empress. She uses her powers to manipulate people into serving her, and then executes them when she deems them as being no longer useful.

France's executive of the Six Heads.

Japan's executive of the Six Heads. He feels pain when Metaphysicals appear.

China's executive of the Six Heads.

The United States's executive of the Six Heads. She speaks to the others through a laptop with a cartoonish animal on the screen.

Other characters

The Principal of Akane Academy and Maya's older sister. (Note: According to the Anime News Network, her name is Mari Yotsukado. She may, therefore, be Maya's older cousin rather than her sister or even not related to her at all (since it is customary in Japan to refer to females not too much older than oneself as 'older sister').)

Nicknamed AJ, she is Edward's maid and has deep affection for him. She later accompanies Moroha in his war against the Russian branch.

He is friends with Mohoroha and Shizuno.

Media

Light novels
The first light novel volume was published on November 15, 2012 by SB Creative under their GA Bunko imprint. The series ended with its 22nd volume on June 14, 2018.

Manga
A manga adaptation began serialization in Kadokawa Shoten's seinen manga magazine Comp Ace from June 2014. It has been collected in four tankōbon volumes.

Anime
A 12-episode anime television series adaptation by Diomedéa aired between January 11 and March 29, 2015.

The anime series has been licensed for streaming by Funimation and Crunchyroll.

Reception
The anime series' first episode received negative reviews from Anime News Network's staff during the Winter 2015 season previews. Rebecca Silverman was optimistic about the premise and said it wasn't as awful as other shows of its ilk during the season but found it generic with its poor execution in storytelling and harem-standard characters that made for an overall lackluster viewing experience. Theron Martin was also intrigued by the fantasy plot concept being used to justify the harem elements but was deterred by the tiring humor, average production and sexist comments made towards women. Nick Creamer heavily criticized the overuse of generic harem tropes throughout the episode, ranging from body humor gags to elements of sexism that "reflect[ive] of an underlying worldview that sees women as unknowable prizes to be won." Zac Bertschy felt the adaptation carried a "generic, flavorless" feel throughout with its direction, female cast and the overall aesthetic of their character designs, calling it "zero-effort junk." Silverman reviewed the complete series in 2016. Despite having both Moroha and Shizuno carry traits above your typical harem characters, she criticized the anime overall for poor storytelling economy, lack of character development and world building, concluding that: "Unless you're in desperate need of a new magic high school story, this is something that you can safely skip."

References

External links
Official manga website 
Official anime website 
TV Tokyo Official Anime Website
Funimation Official Anime website 

2012 Japanese novels
Anime and manga based on light novels
Diomedéa
Funimation
GA Bunko
Kadokawa Shoten manga
Light novels
Seinen manga
Harem anime and manga
TV Tokyo original programming